Kalogeropoulos is a Greek surname, which means son of a monk. The female version of the name is Kalogeropoulou (Καλογεροπούλου). Notable people with the surname include:

Men 
Dimitris Kalogeropoulos, mayor of Egaleo, Greece
Nikolaos Kalogeropoulos (1851-1927), Prime Minister of Greece
Nikos Kalogeropoulos, Greek actor, Filiatra Greece
Nikos Kalogeropoulos, Director of Molonglo Group, a creative production house behind the award-winning NewActon Precinct including Nishi and Hotel Hotel

Women 
Maria Anna Sofia Cecilia Kalogeropoulou, birth name of (Maria Callas), Greek operatic soprano
Xenia Kalogeropoulou, Greek actress

Greek-language surnames
Surnames